Tangvayosaurus (meaning "Tang Vay lizard") is a genus of sauropod dinosaur from the Aptian-Albian age Lower Cretaceous Gres superieurs Formation of Savannakhet Province, Laos. It was a basal somphospondylan, about 15 m long, and is known from the remains of two or three individuals.

Description

It is based on TV4-1 to TV4-36, consisting of a partial pelvis, several back vertebrae and a tail vertebra, ribs, and an upper arm bone (humerus). Another skeleton includes 38 tail vertebrae, a neck vertebra, and most of a hind limb. The type species, Tangvayosaurus hoffeti, was described by a group of a dozen scientists led by Ronan Allain in 1999 and the species name honours French palaeontologist Joshua Hoffet (1901-disappeared 1945). Allain et al. also referred the old species "Titanosaurus" falloti (Hoffet, 1942), from the same formation and based on partial thigh bones and tail vertebrae, to their genus as T. sp. The most recent review tentatively retains the genus because it is different from the only other established sauropod from the same approximate time but found next door in Thailand (Phuwiangosaurus), but disagrees with adding T. falloti to it.

Classification
Although consistently recovered within the Somphospondyli, the exact placement of Tangvayosaurus is debated. It was initially assigned by Allain et al. (1999) to the Titanosauria, who noted strong affinities to Phuwiangosaurus, which they also considered a titanosaur. A more recent review by Suteethorn et al. (2010) resolved both Tangvayosaurus and Phuwiangosaurus as more basal titanosauriforms. The cladogram below follows this analysis.

D'Emic (2012) found that Tangvayosaurus was the sister taxon of Phuwiangosaurus within the Euhelopodidae.

References

Macronarians
Early Cretaceous dinosaurs of Asia
Fossil taxa described in 1999
Taxa named by Philippe Taquet
Taxa named by Octávio Mateus
Fossils of Laos